Mission San Bruno was a short-lived Spanish mission established by Jesuit order on October 7, 1684, in what is now the Loreto Municipality of Baja California Sur, Mexico. The mission was the first Spanish mission established on the Baja California Peninsula.

Location
The ruins of the mission are located along the northern banks of an intermittent river as it flows into the Gulf of California. The mission is unrelated to the present-day town of San Bruno, which is located 110 kilometres (68 mi) to the north of the mission.

History

In 1683, the Spanish admiral Isidro de Atondo y Antillón and the Jesuit missionary Eusebio Francisco Kino were forced to abandon an attempted settlement and mission at La Paz because of hostilities with the native Pericúes and Guaycura.

The date was October 7, 1684, the Feast of San Bruno.

Mission work was begun with about 400 local Cochimi Indians and exploratory expeditions into the surrounding region were undertaken, including the first land crossing of the Baja California Peninsula by Europeans. However, shortages of water and imported food supplies and problems of illness forced the abandonment of San Bruno in May 1685, leaving Baja California again entirely in native hands until the first permanent Jesuit mission was established at Misión de Nuestra Señora de Loreto Conchó in 1697.

The San Bruno experience is documented in the letters and reports of Atondo, Kino, and other participants.

Present day
A few crumbling walls of the uncompleted mission and fortress are all that remain of the San Bruno Mission.

References

Bibliography
 Bolton, Herbert Eugene. 1936. Rim of Christendom. Macmillan, New York.
 Burrus, Ernest J. 1954. Kino Reports to Headquarters: Correspondence of Eusebio F. Kino, S.J., from New Spain with Rome. Instituto Historicum S.J., Rome.
 Burrus, Ernest J. 1965. Kino Writes to the Duchess. Jesuit Historical Institute, Rome.
 Mathes, W. Michael. 1969. First from the Gulf to the Pacific: The Diary of the Kino-Atondo Peninsular Expedition, December 14, 1684 – January 13, 1685. Dawson's Book Shop, Los Angeles.
 Mathes, W. Michael. 1974. Californiana III: documentos para la historia de la transformación colonizadora de California, 1679–1686. José Porrúa Turanzas, Madrid.
 Vernon, Edward W. 2002. Las Misiones Antiguas: The Spanish Missions of Baja California, 1683–1855. Viejo Press, Santa Barbara, California.

See also

 San Bruno, Baja California Sur
 Spanish missions in Baja California
 List of Jesuit sites

San Bruno
Loreto Municipality (Baja California Sur)
1684 establishments in New Spain